The New River is a  tributary of the Chattahoochee River in Coweta and Heard counties in the U.S. state of Georgia.

See also
List of rivers of Georgia

References 

USGS Hydrologic Unit Map - State of Georgia (1974)

Rivers of Georgia (U.S. state)
Rivers of Coweta County, Georgia
Rivers of Heard County, Georgia